Linn Marie Tonstad (born 1978) is an American theologian who serves as Associate Professor of Theology, Religion, and Sexuality at Yale Divinity School.

Biography 

Tonstad joined the faculty at Yale Divinity School in 2012. She co-chairs the Theology and Religious Reflection unit of the American Academy of Religion and is on the steering committee of its Queer Studies in Religion unit.

Publications

Books 

 Queer Theology: Beyond Apologetics (Cascade, 2018)
 God and Difference: The Trinity, Sexuality, and the Transformation of Finitude (Routledge, 2016)

References 

1978 births
American theologians
Christian feminist theologians
Living people
Systematic theologians
Women Christian theologians
Yale Divinity School faculty
Yale University alumni